The Museum of Richmond in the London Borough of Richmond upon Thames  is located in Richmond's Old Town Hall, close to Richmond Bridge.  It was formally opened by Queen Elizabeth II on 28 October 1988.

An independent museum and a registered charity, it is supported by Richmond upon Thames Borough Council. Hilda Clarke chairs the board of trustees; John Lee, Baron Lee of Trafford is deputy chair. Its curator (since February 2021) is Laura Irwin.

The museum's permanent displays, from medieval times to the present day, relate to the history of Richmond, Kew, Petersham and Ham which, until local government boundary changes in 1965, formed the Municipal Borough of Richmond (Surrey). Its temporary exhibitions, education activities and resources, and a programme of events (including events for families and children) cover the whole of the modern borough. The museum's highlights include: 16th-century glass from Richmond Palace; a model of Richmond Palace; and a painting, The Terrace and View from Richmond Hill, Surrey by Dutch draughtsman and painter Leonard Knyff (1650–1722), which is part of the Richmond upon Thames Borough Art Collection.

The museum publishes a quarterly newsletter and organises a programme of talks. Admission to the museum, which is open from Tuesdays to Saturdays, is free.

History
The museum was created in 1983 by local residents led by local historian John Cloake (who was the museum's first chairman). Its first  curator (from 1987 to 1989) was Kate Thaxton.

Exhibitions

The museum's current exhibition, running from 27 September 2022 until May 2023, is Richmond Remembers: 100 Years of the Poppy Factory. Its previous exhibitions include:

2020s
2021–22 OT50 – Fifty Years of The Orange Tree Theatre. Extracts from oral histories that accompanied the exhibition are available online.

2021 The King's Observatory: Richmond's Science Story, about the history of the King's Observatory in Old Deer Park. An extended version of the exhibition is available online. 

2020–21 Queen's Road: 500 Years of History, about Queen's Road, Richmond, a historic road that runs from Sheen Road to the top of Richmond Hill. As physical access to the museum was affected by government restrictions imposed during the  COVID-19 pandemic, a digital version was also produced. The online version is still available.

2010s
 2019–20  Celebrating 800 years of St. Mary Magdalene at the heart of Richmond,  about Richmond's historic parish church
2018–19 Museum of Richmond 30th anniversary exhibition: 30 years, 30 people, 30 objects
 2018 Archaeology: Richmond's Prehistory
 2017–18  Poverty
 2017  Old Palace Lane: Medieval to Modern Richmond
 2016–17   The Royal Star & Garter: 100 Years of Care, marking the centenary of the founding, in Richmond, of the first Star and Garter Home
 2015–16  The Battle of Britain 75 years on – Richmond Remembers the Second World War
 2014–15  1914–1918 Richmond at Home and at War: Local stories and their international links, Richmond's experience of the First World War
 2014  Encountering the Unchartered and back – Three explorers: Ball, Vancouver and Burton, telling the story of explorers Henry Lidgbird Ball, George Vancouver and Richard Burton and their connections with Richmond
 2013 Living and Dying in 19th Century Richmond, exploring the lives of some of Richmond's 19th-century residents
 2012–13  The Building of a Borough, showcasing building plans held in the London Borough of Richmond upon Thames’ Local Studies Collection
 2012  Royal Minstrels to Rock and Roll: 500 years of music-making in Richmond
 2012  Happy and Glorious: popular Royal celebration and commemoration in Richmond
 2010–11 Richmond Theatre: Through the Stages 2010  How the Vote Was Won: Art, Theatre and Women's Suffrage2000s
 2009–10 Richmond – From Page to Screen 2009  From Henry VII to Henry VIII, marking the 500th anniversary of the death of Henry VII at Richmond Palace and the accession to the throne of his son Henry VIII
 2007  The Two Richmonds – A Celebration of their Twinning, marking the 400th anniversary of the founding of Jamestown and the twinning relationship of Richmond, Surrey and Richmond, Virginia
 2007 Trading in Human Lives: The Richmond Connection, on Richmond and the slave trade
 2006–07  Men Remade: Paul Drury’s War in Richmond, featuring the work of the 20th-century artist and printmaker Paul Drury
 2006  A Rich Heritage, featuring items from the borough's Local Studies Collection
 2005–06  Turner-Upon-Thames, focusing on the period when the artist J M W Turner lived in Isleworth and in Twickenham
 2005 Barnes & Mortlake Past, celebrating 50 years of the founding of Barnes and Mortlake History Society
 2004–05  Britflicks-on-Thames: Film Studios of the Borough and Beyond 2004 The Sensational Miss Braddon, about the author Mary Braddon who lived and died in Richmond
 2003 Without Exception,  a selection of original prints by Thomas Rowlandson of "The English Dance of Death" (1815–1816)
 2003  The Virgin Queen in Richmond, marking the 400th anniversary of the death, at Richmond Palace, of Elizabeth I
 2002  The Fight To Save The View, marking the 100th anniversary of the Richmond, Petersham and Ham Open Spaces Act which has protected the view from Richmond Hill
 2002  Stage by Stage: Richmond's Theatrical Heritage 2001–02  Richmond's River: Pictures of and inspired by the Thames in Richmond 2000  From Canvas to Camera: George Hilditch 1803–18571990s

 1998–99   Arthur Hughes: The Last Pre-Raphaelite, about the Pre-Raphaelite artist Arthur Hughes, who died at his house on Kew Green in 1915 and is buried in Richmond Cemetery
 1997–98 Richmond Women Face to Face, famous women who lived in Richmond
 1997 The Henry Doulton Legacy: 120 Years of Royal Doulton 1997 The Best Years of Our Lives? Going to school in Richmond – reminiscences of Richmond school days
 1996–97   Spencer Gore in Richmond, about the artist Spencer Gore who lived in Richmond and died there in 1914
 1995–96 Past & Present: The Changing Face of Richmond 1995 Going Shopping! 1995 The Artist's Inspiration: Views of Richmond upon Thames 1994–95 The Factory of Remembrance: The Poppy & the Royal British Legion Poppy Factory 1994 Father & Son: The Art of Roland & Bernard Batchelor 1994 '''Simplest Country Gentlefolk': The Royal Family at Kew 1727–1841
 1993–94  Prospects About Richmond: mid-18th century drawings and prints by Augustin Heckel
 1993 Richmond at War: The Civilian Experience 1939–45
 1992 Mr K: The legend of Edmund Kean
 1992 Farewell Ice-Rink,  marking the closure that year of Richmond Ice Rink
 1991–92  Mr Rowlandson's Richmond: Thomas Rowlandson's Drawings of Richmond-upon-Thames
 1991 The Richmond Royal Horse Show, an event held regularly in Richmond from 1892 to 1967
 1991 Virginia Woolf and the Hogarth Press in Richmond

1980s

 1989 Pissarro in Richmond, about Camille Pissarro and other artistic members of his family who lived in Kew and Richmond

Publications
The museum's publications include:
Robinson, Derek (2019) The Richmond Vicars: the ministers of St Mary Magdalene and their role in the community, 106pp. 
 Robinson, Derek; Fowler, Simon (2017) Old Palace Lane: Medieval to Modern Richmond, 44pp. Published jointly with the Richmond Local History Society. . A second edition (48pp) was published in 2020. 
 Boyes, Valerie (ed.) (2014) Encountering the Uncharted and Back – three explorers: Ball, Vancouver and Burton, 24pp.
 Boyes, Valerie (with contributions from Govett, John) (2013) Living and Dying in 19th Century Richmond, 25pp.
 Boyes, Valerie (with contributions from Cloake, John and Paytress, Mark) (2012) Royal Minstrels to Rock and Roll: 500 years of music-making in Richmond, 28pp.
 Boyes, Valerie (ed.) (2009) Richmond on Page and Screen, 36pp.
 Moses, John; Cloake, John (2007) The Two Richmonds: a celebration of their twinning, the American connection, 14pp. OCLC 143627273
 Boyes, Valerie (2007) Trading in Human Lives: The Richmond Connection, 28pp.
 Moses, John (2005) Turner-upon-Thames, 13pp.
 Roberts, Leonard and Wildman, Stephen (1999) Arthur Hughes: The Last Pre-Raphaelite, 48pp. 
 Gore, Frederick (1996) Spencer Gore in Richmond: an exhibition at the Museum of Richmond 10 September 1996 to 25 January 1997, 44pp. 
 Museum of Richmond (1994) Simplest Country Gentlefolk: Royal Family at Kew, 1727–1841, 36pp. 
 Jeffree, Richard (1991) Mr Rowlandson's Richmond: Thomas Rowlandson's Drawings of Richmond-upon-Thames, 89pp.

Patrons

Princess Alexandra is the museum's Royal Patron. Its other patrons are: author and broadcaster Anita Anand; broadcaster and naturalist Sir David Attenborough; businesswoman Ann Chapman-Daniel, Richmond hotelier Greville Dare; actor, novelist, screenwriter and film director Julian Fellowes (Baron Fellowes of West Stafford); Lady Annabel Goldsmith;  and broadcaster, writer and politician Lord Watson of Richmond.

See also
John Cloake
Orleans House Gallery
Richmond Local History Society
Twickenham Museum

Notes

References

External links
 Official website

Museum of Richmond
Museum of Richmond
David Attenborough
Charities based in London
History museums in London
Richmond, London
History of the London Borough of Richmond upon Thames
Local museums in London
Museums established in 1988
Museums in Richmond upon Thames